The Chief of General Staff is the highest professional military authority in the Romanian Armed Forces. He is appointed by the President of Romania, at the National Defense Minister's proposal (with the approval of the Prime Minister) on a four-year period, with the possibility of one-year extension. The Deputy Chief of General Staff or one of the Chiefs of the Services can be appointed in this position.

Role of the General Staff 
According to Law no. 346 from 21 July 2006 (art. 12), the General Staff provides for:

 Force command;
 Organization;
 Planning and making operational;
 Gradual increase of readiness levels;
 Mobilization;
 Conduct of joint operations;
 Troops' training;
 Basic and specialty training of the active-duty and reserve military personnel;
 Military personnel individual career management;
 Armaments planning;
 Standardization in the military field;
 Implementation of the C4ISR, logistic and infrastructure system;
 Conduct of the international military relations;
 Religious assistance in the MoND;
 Signing technical agreements with other states armed forces;
 Promotion of the military culture and civil education values.

The Joint Chiefs of Staff Committee is established at the level of the General Staff. The committee is a deliberative structure, having a consultative role. The Joint Chiefs of Staff Committee meets to discuss important topics with regard to the Romanian Armed Forces’ activity, usually quarterly or whenever necessary.

The Chief of General Staff is also the Chairman of the Joint Chiefs of Staff Committee.

The Gallery of the Chiefs of General Staff consists of 48 Flag and Commissioned Officers in the 1859–2006 timeframe.

List of the Chiefs

United Principalities (1860–1881)

Kingdom of Romania (1881–1947)

Socialist Republic of Romania (1947–1989)

Romania (1989–present)

See also
Romanian Land Forces
Romanian Air Force
Romanian Naval Forces

References

Romanian Ministry of Defence website,  
General Staff website

Chiefs of the General Staff of Romania
Romania